The 1996 FIBA Africa Under-18 Championship for Women was the 4th FIBA Africa Under-18 Championship for Women, played under the rules of FIBA, the world governing body for basketball, and the FIBA Africa thereof. The tournament was hosted by Mozambique from September 25 to 28, 1996.

Out of the three teams that were to participate in the tournament only Mali and Mozambique actually competed. The third team, DR Congo, forfeited all their matches. A preliminary match was played by both teams followed by a final, both won by Mali.

As the winner, Mali qualified for the 1997 FIBA U19 Women's World Cup.

Participating teams

Preliminary round

Final

Final standings

Awards

See also
 1997 FIBA Africa Championship for Women

External links
Official Website

References

1996 in African basketball
Bask
FIBA Africa Under-18 Championship for Women
FIBA